Allegre is an unincorporated community located in Todd County, Kentucky, United States.

References

Unincorporated communities in Todd County, Kentucky
Unincorporated communities in Kentucky